Cimatti was an Italian manufacturer of bicycles, motorcycles and mopeds active between 1937 and 1984. 

In 1937, the Olympic cyclist Marco Cimatti founded a small company in Bologna that originally produced bicycles. In 1972–77, he introduced two  models, one for motocross with a five-speed gearbox and the other for road. In those years Cimatti's son Enrico expanded the business to export motorcycles to the United States, France, Norway and Tunisia. In the 1970s through early 1980s, Cimatti produced several moped lines including the City-Bike and the larger Town-Bike. Cimatti used two-stroke engines bought from both Moto Morini and Moto Minarelli. A recession in the early 1980s forced the company to close in 1984.

References

External links

Cimatti bikes. cimattimoto.com

Defunct motorcycle manufacturers of Italy
Moped manufacturers
Manufacturing companies based in Bologna
Vehicle manufacturing companies established in 1951
Vehicle manufacturing companies disestablished in 1984
Defunct manufacturing companies of Italy
Italian companies established in 1951